Mojang Studios is a Swedish video game developer based in Stockholm. The studio is best known for developing the sandbox and survival game Minecraft, the best-selling video game of all time.

Mojang Studios was founded by the independent video game designer Markus Persson in 2009 as Mojang Specifications for Minecrafts development. The studio inherited its name from another video game venture Persson had left two years prior. Following the game's initial release, Persson, in conjunction with Jakob Porsér, incorporated the business as Mojang AB in late 2010, and they hired Carl Manneh as the company's chief executive officer. Other early hires included Daniel Kaplan and Jens Bergensten. Minecraft became highly successful, giving Mojang sustained growth. With a desire to move on from the game, Persson offered to sell his share in Mojang, and the company was acquired by Microsoft in November 2014. Persson, Porsér, and Manneh subsequently left Mojang, with Jonas Mårtensson replacing Manneh. In May 2020, Mojang was rebranded as Mojang Studios.

As of 2021, the company employs approximately 600 people. Executives include chief executive officer Mårtensson and studio head Helen Chiang. Apart from Minecraft, Mojang Studios has developed Caller's Bane, Crown and Council, and further games in the Minecraft franchise: Minecraft Dungeons, the upcoming Minecraft Legends, and the cancelled Minecraft Earth. It also released smaller games as part of game jams organised by Humble Bundle and published the externally developed Cobalt and Cobalt WASD.

History

Background and formation (2009–2010) 

Mojang Studios was founded by Markus Persson, a Swedish independent video game designer and programmer, in 2009. He had gained interest in video games at an early age, playing The Bard's Tale and several pirated games on his father's Commodore 128 home computer, and learned to programme at age eight with help from his sister. Because he was a "loner" in school, he spent most of his spare time with games and programming at home. Following his graduation and a few years of working as a web developer, Persson created Wurm Online, a massively multiplayer online role-playing game, with colleague Rolf Jansson in 2003. They used the name "Mojang Specifications" during the development and, as the game started turning a profit, incorporated the company Mojang Specifications AB (an aktiebolag) in 2007. Persson left the project later that year and wished to reuse the name, so Jansson renamed the company Onetoofree AB and later Code Club AB. Meanwhile, Persson had joined Midas, later known as King.com, where he developed 25–30 games. He departed the company when he was barred from creating games in his free time.

In May 2009, Persson began working on a clone of Infiniminer, a game developed by Zachtronics and released earlier that year. Persson reused assets and parts of the engine code from an earlier personal project and released the first alpha version of the game, now titled Minecraft, on 17 May 2009, followed by the first commercial version on 13 June 2009. He reused the name "Mojang Specifications" for this release. In less than a month, Minecraft had generated enough revenue for Persson to take time off his day job, which he was able to quit entirely by May 2010. As all sales were processed through the game's website, he did not have to split income with third parties. The payment services provider PayPal temporarily disabled his account when it suspected fraud.

In September 2010, Persson travelled to Bellevue, Washington, to the offices of video game company Valve, where he took part in a programming exercise and met with Gabe Newell, before being offered a job at the company. He turned down the offer and instead contacted Jakob Porsér, a former colleague from King.com, to ask for aid in establishing a business out of Mojang Specifications. In response, Porsér stated that he would quit his job the following day, and they subsequently incorporated Mojang AB. While Persson continued working on Minecraft, Porsér would develop Scrolls, a digital collectable card game. Wishing to focus on game development, they hired Carl Manneh, the manager of jAlbum, Persson's previous employer, as chief executive officer. Other significant early hires included Daniel Kaplan as business developer, Markus Toivonen as an art director, and Jens Bergensten as lead programmer.

Continued growth (2011–2013) 

In January 2011, Minecraft reached one million registered accounts and ten million six months thereafter. The continued success led Mojang to start the development of a new version for mobile devices. Due to the incompatibility of the game's Java-based framework with mobile devices, this version was programmed in C++ instead. Another version, initially developed for Xbox 360, was outsourced to Scotland-based developer 4J Studios, which also used C++. Scrolls was announced by Mojang in March 2011. The studio's attempt to trademark the game's name resulted in a dispute with ZeniMax Media, which cited similarities between the game's name and that of the ZeniMax-owned The Elder Scrolls series. Kaplan stated in May 2011 that, due to many such requests in the past, Mojang was planning to publish or co-publish games from other indie game studios. Its first, Cobalt from Oxeye Game Studio, was announced in August. An early version of the game was made available in December 2011, with the full game released in February 2016 for Xbox 360, Xbox One, and Windows. A multiplayer-focused spin-off, Cobalt WASD, was also developed by Oxeye Game Studio and released by Mojang for Windows in November 2017 after some time in early access.

For the full release of Minecraft, Mojang held Minecon, a dedicated convention event, in Las Vegas on 18–19 November 2011, with Minecraft formally being released during a presentation on the first day. Thereafter, Minecon was turned into an annual event. Following Minecrafts full release, Persson transferred his role as lead designer for the game to Bergensten in December 2011.

Around this time, Manneh had discussion with a plethora of venture capital firms, including Sequoia Capital and Accel Partners, but turned all of them down as the company did not require any funds. Sean Parker, the co-founder of Napster and former president of Facebook, Inc., offered to privately invest in Mojang in 2011 but was turned down as well. At the time, the studio ruled out being sold or becoming a public company to maintain its independence, which was said to have heavily contributed to Minecrafts success. In 2013, it released an education-focused version of Minecraft for Raspberry Pi devices, and—after the exclusivity clause penned with Microsoft over the availability of the game's console edition on Microsoft's platforms had expired—announced editions of the game for PlayStation 3, PlayStation 4, and PlayStation Vita. In October 2013, Jonas Mårtensson, formerly of gambling company Betsson, was hired as Mojang's vice-president.

Microsoft subsidiary (2014–present) 
Persson, exhausted from the pressure of being the owner of Minecraft, published a tweet in June 2014, asking whether anyone would be willing to buy his share in Mojang. Several parties expressed interest in this offer, including Activision Blizzard, Electronic Arts, and Microsoft. Phil Spencer, the head of Microsoft's Xbox division, urged Microsoft's newly appointed chief executive Satya Nadella to purchase Mojang to set out "a pretty bold vision" for Microsoft's gaming business. Furthermore, the company had  in offshore bank accounts that it could not bring back to the United States without paying repatriation taxes. Nadella separately stated the possible use of Minecraft with the HoloLens, Microsoft's mixed reality device, to have been a major factor in pursuing the acquisition. The company first approached Mojang regarding a potential acquisition in June 2014, making its first offer shortly thereafter. Mojang subsequently hired advisers from JPMorgan Chase.

Persson, Porsér and Manneh were the only shareholders at this time, of whom Persson owned 71% of shares. The acquisition was finalised on 6 November and Mojang became part of the Microsoft Studios branch. All three subsequently left Mojang and Mårtensson succeeded Manneh. Under the oversight of Microsoft's Matt Booty, Mojang's integration was minimal, leaving its operations independent but backed by Microsoft's financial and technical capabilities. The approach shaped how Microsoft would acquire other gaming companies.

Scrolls was released out-of-beta in December 2014 and development of further content ceased in 2015. Also in December 2014, Mojang and Telltale Games jointly announced a partnership in which the latter would develop Minecraft: Story Mode, an episodic, narrative-driven game set in the Minecraft universe. In April 2016, Mojang released Crown and Council, a game entirely developed by artist Henrik Pettersson (who had been hired in August 2011), for free for Windows. An update in January 2017 introduced Linux and macOS versions. Mojang discontinued support for Scrolls online services in February 2018 and re-released the game under a free-to-play model and with the name Caller's Bane in June. Aiming to expand the Minecraft franchise with further games, Mojang developed two spin-offs: Minecraft Dungeons, a dungeon crawler, and Minecraft Earth, an augmented reality game in the vein of Pokémon Go. They were announced in September 2018 and May 2019, respectively.

Minecraft Classic, the original browser-based version of Minecraft, was re-released for free on its ten-year anniversary in May 2019. By this time, Minecraft had sold 147 million copies, making it the best-selling video game of all time. Persson was explicitly excluded from the anniversary's festivities due to several controversial statements of his involving transphobia and other issues; an update for Minecraft released the March before also removed several references to Persson. On 17 May 2020, Minecrafts eleventh anniversary, Mojang announced its rebranding to Mojang Studios, aiming to reflect its multi-studio structure, and introduced a new logo. Minecraft Dungeons was released later that month for Windows, Nintendo Switch, PlayStation 4, and Xbox One. In June 2022, the studio announced the action-strategy game Minecraft Legends.

Games developed

Game jam games 
Mojang partnered with Humble Bundle in 2012 to launch Mojam, a game jam event to raise money for charity, as part of which Mojang developed the shoot 'em up mini-game Catacomb Snatch. 81,575 bundles including the game were sold, raising . The following year, Mojang developed three mini-games for Mojam 2. The studio also participated in Humble Bundle's Games Against Ebola game jam in 2014 with three further mini-games.

Unreleased games 
In 2011, Persson and Kaplan envisioned a hybrid of Minecraft and Lego bricks and agreed with the Lego Group to develop the game as Brickcraft, codenamed Rex Kwon Do (in reference to the film Napoleon Dynamite). The game has also been described as a first-person shooter. Mojang hired two new programmers to work on the game, while a prototype was created by Persson. However, Mojang cancelled the project after six months. Upon announcing the cancellation in July 2012, Persson stated that the move was performed so that Mojang could focus on the games it wholly owned. Daniel Mathiasen, a Lego Group employee at the time, later blamed the cancellation on a series of legal hurdles that the Lego Group had put in place to protect the product's family-friendly image. Kaplan lamented that the staff at Mojang had felt more like consultants on the project, rather than its designers. The Lego Group also considered acquiring Mojang at this point but later decided against doing so as they had not foreseen that Minecraft would become as popular as it would at one point be.

In March 2012, Persson revealed that he would be designing a sandbox space trading and combat simulator in the likes of Elite. Titled 0x10c, it was to be set in the year 281,474,976,712,644 AD in a parallel universe. The project was shelved by August 2013, with Persson citing a lack of interest and a creative block. Minecraft Earth was made available as an early-access game in November 2019 for Android and iOS. In January 2021, it was announced that the game would be withdrawn from sale in June that year, with all player data deleted in July. Mojang Studios cited the ongoing COVID-19 pandemic as primary reason for the game's closure, as its effects conflicted with the game's concept.

Games published

Legal disputes

Scrolls naming dispute 
In August 2011, after Mojang had attempted to trademark the word "Scrolls" for their game, ZeniMax Media, the parent company of The Elder Scrolls publisher Bethesda Softworks, issued a cease and desist letter, claiming that Scrolls infringed on ZeniMax's "The Elder Scrolls" trademark, that Mojang could not use the name, and that ZeniMax would sue the studio over the word's usage. Persson offered to give up the trademark and add a subtitle to Scrolls name, however, as Mojang ignored the cease and desist letter, ZeniMax filed the lawsuit in September. Bethesda's Pete Hines stated that Bethesda was not responsible for the lawsuit, rather the issue was centred around "lawyers who understand it". Mojang won an interim injunction in October, the ruling being that Scrolls and The Elder Scrolls were too easy to differentiate, though ZeniMax could still appeal the ruling. In March 2012, Mojang and ZeniMax settled, with all "Scrolls" trademarks and trademark applications being transferred to ZeniMax, who would in turn licence the name to Mojang for use with Scrolls and add-on content, but not for sequels or any other games with similar names.

Uniloc USA, Inc. et al v. Mojang AB 
On 20 July 2012, Uniloc, a company specialising in digital rights management technologies, filed a lawsuit against Mojang, stating that the licence verification system in Minecrafts Android version infringed on one of Uniloc's patents. The case was Uniloc USA, Inc. et al v. Mojang AB and was filed with the United States District Court for the Eastern District of Texas. In response to hate mail, Uniloc founder Ric Richardson denied his involvement, claiming to have only filed the patent. The patent was invalidated in March 2016.

Putt-Putt cease and desist 
In July 2013, the minigolf chain Putt-Putt issued a cease and desist letter against Mojang and Don Mattrick (who was previously affiliated with Minecrafts Xbox 360 version but had since joined Zynga), alleging that they infringed on its "Putt-Putt" trademark. Attached to the letter, which Persson shared on Twitter, was a Google Search screenshot showing videos of user-created maps using the name. Alex Chapman, Mojang's lawyer, stated "I think there is clearly a misunderstanding here as to what Minecraft actually is. It's a game that, amongst other things, allows people to build things. Mojang doesn't control what users build and Mojang doesn't control the content of the videos users make. Suing Mojang for what people do using Minecraft is like suing Microsoft for what people do using Word."

Notes

References

External links 
 

 
2014 mergers and acquisitions
Companies based in Stockholm
First-party video game developers
Markus Persson
Microsoft subsidiaries
Swedish companies established in 2009
Video game companies established in 2009
Video game companies of Sweden
Video game development companies
Video game publishers
Xbox Game Studios